Tasuj Rural District is in Shonbeh and Tasuj District of Dashti County, Bushehr province, Iran. At the census of 2006, its population was 947 in 224 households; there were 921 inhabitants in 233 households at the following census of 2011; and in the most recent census of 2016, the population of the rural district was 1,066 in 311 households. The largest of its 13 villages was Sarmak, with 291 people.

References 

Rural Districts of Bushehr Province
Populated places in Dashti County